Karl Mager (January 1, 1810 – June 10, 1858) was a German educator.

Mager was born in Gräfrath. He studied philology in Bonn, Berlin, and Paris, and stayed in Paris for some years, during which time he wrote Versuch einer Geschichte und Charakteristik der französischen Nationallitteratur ("Attempt at a history and characterization of the French national literature", 1834–39, 5 vols.). Upon his return to Germany, he studied the philosophy of Hegel and Johann Friedrich Herbart, and the pedagogy of Adolph Diesterweg and Johann Heinrich Pestalozzi. He wrote articles on the teaching of foreign languages for a journal edited by Diesterweg in 1835 and 1838, which gained him a job as professor at a cantonal school in Geneva. However, he quickly moved to Bad Cannstatt due to poor health.

In 1840, he published Die deutsche Bürgerschule, and founded the journal Pädagogische Revue, both of which would be influential on German and Swiss public education. He edited the Pädagogische Revue until 1849, taught foreign languages in the cantonal schools of Aarau to test his theories in a practical setting, and published Die genetische Methode des Unterrichts in fremden Sprachen ("The genetic method of instruction in foreign languages", 1846). From 1848 to 1852 he directed the Realschule in Eisenach according to his theories, but he retired in 1852 due to poor health, and died in 1858 in Wiesbaden.

An 1844 pamphlet of his coined the term "social pedagogy", a broad concept of education, particularly influential in German pedagogy, that focuses on the acquisition of culture by society (rather than the acquisition of knowledge by individuals) as its key element.

References

External links
 

1810 births
1858 deaths
German educational theorists
19th-century educational theorists